Lee Epstein is an American political scientist who is currently the University Professor of Law & Political Science and Charles L. and Ramona I. Hilliard Distinguished Professor of Law at the University of Southern California.

Career

University positions 
After receiving her doctorate at Emory University, Epstein taught at Emory for three years as an Assistant Professor of Political Science. Next, she worked at Southern Methodist University first as an Assistant Professor and then as an Associate Professor of Political Science for a total of five years. In 1991, she began teaching in the Political Science department at Washington University in St. Louis. Epstein served as the Chair of the Political Science department from 1995 to 1999 and then again in 2003. In 1998, she was appointed as the Mallinckrodt Distinguished University Professor of Political Science and served in that role until 2006. She also taught in the Washington University Law School as a Professor of Law from 2000 to 2006. From 2006 to 2011, Epstein taught at Northwestern University, first as the Beatrice Kuhn Professor of Law, and next a university-wide chair as the Henry Wade Rogers Professor. Next, from 2011 to 2015, she served as the Provost Professor of Law and Political Science and the Rader Family Trustee Chair in Law at the University of Southern California. In 2015, she returned to Washington University in St. Louis and was appointed as the Ethan A. H. Shepley Professor and Distinguished Professor. She teaches Political Science and Law at the undergraduate and graduate levels at WashU and is also the co-director at WashU's Center for Empirical Research in Law.

Research and work 
She has authored or co-authored 18 books and over 100 articles and essays.

Honors 
Epstein is an Elected Fellow of the American Academy of Arts and Sciences and American Academy of Political and Social Science.

References

Living people
Washington University in St. Louis faculty
American women political scientists
American political scientists
Emory University alumni
University of Southern California faculty
Northwestern University faculty
1958 births